"I Think I'm in Love with You" is a song written and produced by Cory Rooney and Dan Shea for Jessica Simpson's 1999 debut album, Sweet Kisses. It contains a sample of singer-songwriter John Mellencamp's "Jack & Diane" (1982) and was released as the album's third and final single in mid-2000; in Japan, it was issued as the album's second single in February 2000. The single reached the top 10 in Australia and Canada and the top 20 in Iceland, New Zealand, and the United Kingdom. In the United States, it peaked at number 21 on the Billboard Hot 100.

Los Angeles radio station KBIG-104 produced a mixed version of "I Think I'm in Love with You" with a few samples of "Jack and Diane" lyrics and the same ending as the original version. Simpson recorded a Spanish version of the song titled "Tal vez Es Amor". A radio / single mix of the song was also released with a slightly longer outro. It is 22 seconds longer than the original album version.

Composition

"I Think I'm in Love with You" is a dance-pop song, with a length of three minutes and 35 seconds. The song samples the signature opening guitar-based melody line of John Mellencamp's 1982 hit Jack & Diane. The song is written in the key of A major, with a chord progression of A–E/A–A–E-D, and the song is set in common time with a tempo of 106 beats per minute. The vocal range spans from D4 to F♯5.

Chart performance
"I Think I'm in Love with You" was more up-tempo than Simpson's previous singles and became a moderate hit. In the United States, the single debuted at number 63 on the Billboard Hot 100, on the issue dated July 1, 2000. Due largely on the strength of its radio airplay, the song peaked at number 21 in its seventh week and stayed on the chart for 16 weeks. The single reached number five on Billboard Pop Songs and stayed on chart for 22 weeks. "I Think I'm in Love with You" was her first top five on the chart. Also achieved success on the Adult Contemporary and Rhythmic Top 40 charts. As the date, "I Think I'm in Love with You" sold 20,000 physical copies and has sold over 316,000 paid digital downloads according to Nielsen SoundScan.

In Canada, "I Think I'm in Love with You" reached the top 20, peaking at number 14. It became her second top 20 hit in that country. The song also reached number two on the Canada RPM singles chart and was her highest peak at the time. The song stayed on the chart for 20 weeks. In Australia, the single debuted at number 30 on the ARIA Charts during the week of June 25, 2000. Five weeks later, it reached number 10 and was her second top 10 there. The single stayed on the chart for 15 weeks. It was later certified gold by the Australian Recording Industry Association (ARIA), denoting shipments of 35,000 units within the country. In New Zealand, the song debuted at number 33 on the issue of August 6, 2000. In its third week on the chart, the single peaked at number 20.

In United Kingdom, "I Think I'm in Love with You" debuted at number 15 on the UK Singles Chart in the week of July 15, 2000, and stayed on the chart for seven weeks. It became her second top 20 single there. In Switzerland, the single debuted at number 61 on the issue dated June 25, 2000. In the next week it peaked at number 41 and stayed on the chart for 12 weeks. The single peaked at number three on the Ultratip chart of Belgium's Wallonia region, and number 36 on the Belgium Flanders Ultratop 50 chart. It also reached number 30 in Italy. "I Think I'm in Love with You" peaked at number 31 on the European Hot 100 Singles chart, as compiled by Billboard.

Music video
"I Think I'm in Love with You" was the first of Simpson's videos to be set to an up-tempo beat. The video was directed by Nigel Dick. The video starts out with Jessica and her girlfriends, including her sister, Ashlee running into a group of factory workers unloading furniture from a truck. The workers join Simpson and her girlfriends in an impromptu dance on the streets.  The video is also intercut with scenes of Simpson in front of a giant heart.

The video's TRL world premiere debut was on June 1, 2000, at number 10. The video peaked at number five and stayed on the countdown for 25 days, making it her first successful video on MTV's TRL.

Live performances

"I Think I'm in Love with You" was included on the set list of the Heat It Up Tour (1999), DreamChaser Tour (2001) and Reality Tour (2004). Simpson performed the song at the Wango Tango concert organized by KISS-FM on May 13, 2000. Five days later, she performed the song on The Rosie O'Donnell Show on May 18, 2000. On June 2, 2000, Simpson performed it at the Zootopia concert, organized by Radio Z-100. Later, she performed at Summer Music Mania on August 13, 2000. She also performed on Arthur Ashe Kids Day festivities in New York, on August 26, 2000. On November 21, 2000, she performed the song at the World AIDS Day Concert. On November 23, 2000, Simpson performed the song on The Salvation Army's National Kettle Kick-off half-time show.

Track listing
US maxi-CD
"I Think I'm in Love with You" (radio version) – 3:40
"I Think I'm in Love with You" (Peter Rauhofer Club Mix) – 9:22
"I Think I'm in Love with You" (Peter Rauhofer Dub Mix) – 5:56
"I Think I'm in Love with You" (Lenny B's Club Mix) – 9:41
"I Think I'm in Love with You" (Soda Club Funk Mix) – 7:29

US 12" single
 "I Think I'm in Love with You" (Peter Rauhofer Club Mix) – 9:19
 "I Think I'm in Love with You" (Peter Rauhofer Dub Mix) – 6:00
 "I Think I'm in Love with You" (Lenny B's Club Mix) – 9:39
 "I Think I'm in Love with You" (Soda Club Funk Mix) – 7:30

Europe CD single
"I Think I'm in Love with You" (album version)
"I Wanna Love You Forever" (Soda Club Radio Mix)
"Where You Are" featuring Nick Lachey (Lenny B's Radio Mix)

UK CD single 1
"I Think I'm in Love with You"
"I Think I'm in Love with You" (Soda Club Funk Mix)
"I Wanna Love You Forever" (music video)

UK CD single 2
"I Think I'm in Love with You"
"I Think I'm in Love with You" (Lenny B's Radio Mix)
"Where You Are" featuring Nick Lachey (music video)

UK cassette single
"I Think I'm in Love with You" (radio version)
"I Think I'm in Love with You" (Soda Club Mix)

Australian CD single
"I Think I'm in Love with You" (radio version)
"I Think I'm in Love with You" (album version)
"You Don't Know What Love Is"
"I Wanna Love You Forever" (Soul Solution Remix Radio Edit)

Japan CD single
"I Think I'm in Love with You" (radio version)
"I Wanna Love You Forever" (Soul Solution Remix Radio Edit)

Charts

Weekly charts

Year-end charts

Certifications

Release history

Other versions

Tal Vez es Amor

Background and release 
In 2000, Simpson recorded her first song is Spanish, with producer Manuel Benito. The song was recorded for the album Divas En Español. "Tal Vez es Amor" was written and produced by Manuel Benito among the former producers of the song, Cory Rooney, Dan Shea and John Mellencamp.

References

2000 singles
Dance-pop songs
Jessica Simpson songs
Music videos directed by Nigel Dick
Songs written by John Mellencamp
Songs written by Dan Shea (producer)
Songs written by Cory Rooney
Song recordings produced by Cory Rooney
Song recordings produced by Dan Shea (producer)
1999 songs
Columbia Records singles